Simor Jalal (born July 27, 1983 in Baghdad, Iraq), is an Iraqi singer, composer, and musician.

Career

He entered the music department of the Institute of Fine Arts in Baghdad in 1999 and completed his studies there in 2004. Simor studied the oud and Turkish saz, and is also fluent in playing the piano and violin. He has recorded many Iraqi songs, some of his own composing  and others composed by well-known Iraqi composers.

He first became well known in the Arab world due to his participation in MBC The Voice, a program on the channel MBC, where he got positive comments from all judges for his musical and vocal skills.
He is also sang in Syriac and Turkish.

In the summer of 2014 Simor participated in the International Festival of Carthage in Tunisia as an honored guest in at a Saber Rebaï concert.

"Our people" Charity Campaign -with Naseer Shamma
Simor participated in the campaign (our people: Ahlona), along with Iraqi musician Naseer Shamma in 2015. He held a charity concert to collect donations for Iraqi refugees; and at that concert he released two songs composed by musician Naseer Shamma titled: Baghdad and Good morning, my mother. This concert was released in the National Theater 04/05/2015 in Baghdad.

See also
 Saber Rebaï
 Kadhim Al-Sahir
 Mohammed Abdel Wahab
 Nazem Al-Ghazali
 Naseer Shamma
 İbrahim Tatlıses

External links
 Simor Jalal TV website

References

1983 births
Living people
Iraqi anti-war activists
21st-century Iraqi male singers
People from Baghdad
Singers who perform in Classical Arabic
The Voice (franchise) contestants
Iraqi composers
Iraqi Christians
Performers of Christian music in Arabic
Turkish-language singers
Syriac-language singers